The Pinacotecta Nazionale is an art gallery in Ferrara, Emilia-Romagna, Italy. It is located on the piano nobile (or first floor) of the Palazzo dei Diamanti, a work of Renaissance architecture by Biagio Rossetti, commissioned by Leonello d’Este in 1447. Not to be confused with the Civic Museum on the lower floor, which has hosted temporary exhibitions of contemporary art since 1992, the Pinacoteca houses a collection of paintings by the Ferrarese School dating from the thirteenth to the eighteenth centuries. It was founded in 1836 by the Municipality of Ferrara after Napoleon's widespread dissolution of churches threatened the protection of important public artworks. The gallery is formed as much around notable northern Italian painters as it is around the exquisite interior decoration of the palace itself, together with remnants of frescoes from local churches and later acquisitions from the Sacrati Strozzi collection.

Since 2015 the Pinacoteca Nazionale has formed a part of the Gallerie Estensi, a network of museums sharing Ferrara's cultural heritage with that of Modena and Sassuolo.

Exhibits 

The Pinacoteca tells the history of the House of Este from that family's promotion as dukes of Ferrara in 1296 to its forced relocation to Modena in 1598. The gallery contains an impressive range of Italian works spanning the reigns of the dukes Leonello, Borso, Ercole I, Alfonso I and Alfonso II d'Este. Arranged chronologically, the exhibition begins with a room dedicated to late Gothic sculpture, fresco and panel painting, progressing through to the early Renaissance, the sixteenth century, Mannerism and lastly to the early seventeenth century, before Cesare I lost Ferrara to the Papal States. Highlights of the tour include the Hall of Honour, the sixteenth-century apartments of Virginia de' Medici (the roundels for these, early products of the Carracci workshop, can be seen in Modena's Galleria Estense) and a room dedicated to the step-by-step process of creating a fresco, panel or oil painting, complementing Cennino Cennini’s Il Libro dell’arte.

Gallery

Collection 
Deposition from the Cross by Bastarolo (Giuseppe Mazzuoli)
Allegory with Bacchus; The Virgin and Child, St. Lucy and St. Matthew; Circumcision by Bastianino
Adoration of the Magi predella by Jacopo and Giovanni Bellini
Wedding at Cana; Guardian Angel by Carlo Bononi
Death of the Virgin by Vittore Carpaccio
The Dream of the Virgin by Simone dei Crocifissi
Two works from a liberal arts cycle by Dosso Dossi
Vision of St. John the Evangelist by Battista Dossi
Madonna and Child by Gentile de Fabriano
Annunciation by Vicino da Ferrara
St. John the Baptist by the Master of Figline
Madonna of the Clouds; Massacre of the Innocents by Il Garofalo
Adoration of the Shepherds by Gaetano Gandolfi
Christ on the Cross attributed to Guariento
The Martyrdom of St. Maurilius by Guercino
Head of St John the Baptist by Giovanni Francsco Maineri
Christ with the Animula of the Virgin by Andrea Mantegna
Nativity with St. Bernard and St. Alberic by Ludovico Mazzolino
Flight to Egypt; Agony in the Garden; Deposition by Ortolano (Giovan Battista Benvenuti)
St. Louis of Toulouse; Saint Bernardine of Siena by Michele Pannonio
St. Sebastian, St. Joseph, St. Job and Worshippers from the Mori family; Death of the Virgin by Nicolò Pisano
Italian Capriccio with River Haven by Hubert Robert
St. Petronius by Ercole de' Roberti
Noli me tangere; Wedding at Cana by Scarsellino
The Triumph of Saint Augustine fresco attributed to Serafino de' Serafini
The Trial and Martyrdom of St. Maurelius by Cosmè Tura
Virgin and Child by Master of the Wide Eyes

The Costabili Polyptych by Il Garofalo and Dosso Dossi

The Muses Erato and Urania from Leonello d’Este's Studiolo of Belfiore

Frescoes from the 14th and early 15th century such as Scenes from the life of St. John the Evangelist and Virtues and Vices.

See also
 List of national galleries

Bibliography 

 Giovanni Fei, Municipal Art Gallery of Ferrara: catalogue of the paintings that make up the Municipal Art Gallery of Ferrara – expanded with historical and bibliographical information for Giovanni Fei, Artist and Public Pinacotecario, Ferrara, typography of the Eridano, 1878, non-existent ISBN.
 Jadranka Bettini (ed.) La Pinacoteca Nazionale di Ferrara. General catalogue, Bologna, Nuova Alfa editorial, 1992, .
 Sonia Cavicchioli, In the centuries of magnificence. Clients and interior decoration in Emilia in the Sixteenth and Seventeenth centuries. Argelato, Bologna, Minerva, 2008, pp. 105–125,  . 
 Marcello Toffanello, Ferrara, The Renaissance City and the Po delta, Rome, Instituto Poligrafico and Zecca dello Stato, 2005, pp. 102–106, . .

Related entries 
Estense Gallery
Estense University library
Estense Lapidary Museum
Ducal Palace of Sassuolo
Gallerie Estensi

References

Other projects 
 

Museums in Ferrara
Art museums and galleries in Italy
Art museums established in 1929
1929 establishments in Italy
National museums of Italy